Hullabaloo or hullaballoo may refer to:

 Hullabaloo (band), a punk band
 Hullabaloo (song), a 1990 single by Australian band Absent Friends (band)
 Hullabaloo (festival), a music festival at the University of California San Diego
 Hullabaloo (film), a 1940 film
 Hullabaloo (The Farm album), 1994
 Hullabaloo (TV series), a 1960s NBC musical variety series
 Hullabaloo Soundtrack, a 2002 compilation album and DVD by Muse
 Tulane Hullabaloo, the student newspaper of Tulane University
 The Hullaballoos, a British Invasion rock and roll band

See also 

 Brouhaha
 Protest (disambiguation)
 Commotion (disambiguation)